Grangärde is a locality situated in Ludvika Municipality, Dalarna County, Sweden, with 351 inhabitants in 2010.

Grangärde Court District, or Grangärde tingslag, was a district of Dalarna in Sweden. The court district (tingslag) served as the basic division of the rural areas in Dalarna, except for one district that was a hundred (härad). The entire province had once been a single hundred, called Dala hundare.

Heavy metal musician, Peter Tägtgren, was born in Grangärde.

References 

Populated places in Dalarna County
Populated places in Ludvika Municipality